State Route 127 (SR 127) is a state highway running between Dresden and Georgetown in the U.S. state of Maine.

Route description 
The route starts to the east of Georgetown, and goes in towards the center of the settlement before turning north towards Arrowsic. Passing through Arrowsic, the route then passes through Woolwich and Dresden before terminating at SR 27.

History 
SR 127 was originally created in 1925 and ran between Gardiner and Wiscasset. The following year, that route became SR 27, and SR 127 was moved to its current route. SR 127 originally ran to the shoreline, but in 2003, it was truncated to a rural intersection.

Junction list

References

127
Transportation in Sagadahoc County, Maine
Transportation in Lincoln County, Maine